Zlatko Janjić (born 7 May 1986) is a Bosnian-Herzegovinian former professional footballer who played a forward.

Club career
Janjić made his Bundesliga debut for Arminia Bielefeld in 2008.

He joined MSV Duisburg for the 2014–15 season.

In early February 2018, Janjić moved to Polish side Korona Kielce. He played there until 31 January 2019, when he joined SG Sonnenhof Großaspach on a contract for the rest of the season.

References

External links

1986 births
Living people
People from Gradiška, Bosnia and Herzegovina
Association football forwards
Bosnia and Herzegovina footballers
Arminia Bielefeld players
SV Wehen Wiesbaden players
FC Erzgebirge Aue players
MSV Duisburg players
Korona Kielce players
SG Sonnenhof Großaspach players
SC Verl players
Rot-Weiss Essen players
Bundesliga players
2. Bundesliga players
3. Liga players
Regionalliga players
Oberliga (football) players
Ekstraklasa players
Bosnia and Herzegovina expatriate footballers
Expatriate footballers in Germany
Bosnia and Herzegovina expatriate sportspeople in Germany
Expatriate footballers in Poland
Bosnia and Herzegovina expatriate sportspeople in Poland